Stanislav "Slava" Medvedenko (born April 4, 1979) is a Ukrainian former professional basketball player, who played with the Atlanta Hawks and the Los Angeles Lakers in the National Basketball Association. His position was power forward. After his basketball career ended Medvedenko embarked on a political career in Ukraine.

NBA career
Medvedenko, who joined the Los Angeles Lakers in 2000, is known for his shoot-first mentality. His shooting technique and skill have never been in doubt, but his work ethic and defense were far behind his offensive skills in his early career (much to the ire of sports commentators, especially Stephen A. Smith).

The 2003–04 season was his breakout year, as Karl Malone injured his knee and Medvedenko started the majority of games. As such, his scoring and rebounding averages doubled and he was no longer seen as a liability in the fans' eyes. Unfortunately, an injury kept him out of the 2004 pre-season and he dropped down the depth chart, unable to find his way back into the lineup under Rudy Tomjanovich. With Phil Jackson's return to the Lakers, there was hope that Medvedenko would play a greater role due to his experience with the triangle offense.  However, due to a herniated disc in his lower back that required surgery, he missed almost the entire 2006 season. He was waived at the beginning of March 2006, to clear roster space to enable the Lakers to sign guard Jim Jackson.

Medvedenko was signed by the Atlanta Hawks on December 28, 2006 for about $600,000, for the remainder of the season.

NBA career statistics

Regular season

|-
| style="text-align:left;background:#afe6ba;"| †
| style="text-align:left;"| L.A. Lakers
| 7 || 0 || 5.6 || .480 || 1.000 || .583 || 1.3 || .3 || .1 || .1 || 4.6
|-
| style="text-align:left;background:#afe6ba;"| †
| style="text-align:left;"| L.A. Lakers
| 71 || 6 || 10.3 || .477 || .000 || .661 || 2.2 || .6 || .4 || .2 || 4.7
|-
| style="text-align:left;"| 
| style="text-align:left;"| L.A. Lakers
| 58 || 10 || 10.7 || .434 || .000 || .721 || 2.4 || .3 || .2 || .1 || 4.4
|-
| style="text-align:left;"| 
| style="text-align:left;"| L.A. Lakers
| 68 || 38 || 21.2 || .441 || .000 || .767 || 5.0 || .8 || .6 || .3 || 8.3
|-
| style="text-align:left;"| 
| style="text-align:left;"| L.A. Lakers
| 43 || 4 || 9.8 || .455 || .000 || .821 || 1.8 || .3 || .2 || .0 || 3.8
|-
| style="text-align:left;"| 
| style="text-align:left;"| L.A. Lakers
| 2 || 0 || 3.0 || .500 || .000 || .000 || .0 || .5 || .0 || .0 || 1.0
|-
| style="text-align:left;"| 
| style="text-align:left;"| Atlanta
| 14 || 0 || 5.8 || .414 || .500 || .850 || 1.0 || .1 || .0 || .1 || 3.0
|- class="sortbottom"
| style="text-align:center;" colspan="2" | Career
| 263 || 58 || 12.7 || .450 || .154 || .740 || 2.8 || .5 || .3 || .2 || 5.3

Playoffs

|-
| style="text-align:left;background:#afe6ba;"| 2002†
| style="text-align:left;"| L.A. Lakers
| 7 || 0 || 3.0 || .600 || .000 || .000 || .6 || .0 || .0 || .0 || .9
|-
| style="text-align:left;"| 2003
| style="text-align:left;"| L.A. Lakers
| 9 || 0 || 8.1 || .556 || .000 || .667 || 2.0 || .1 || .1 || .1 || 3.8
|-
| style="text-align:left;"| 2004
| style="text-align:left;"| L.A. Lakers
| 21 || 1 || 11.3 || .440 || .000 || .810 || 2.5 || .5 || .2 || .2 || 4.0
|- class="sortbottom"
| style="text-align:center;" colspan="2" | Career
| 37 || 1 || 8.9 || .477 || .000 || .778 || 2.0 || .3 || .1 || .1 || 3.3

Political career
Medvedenko was a candidate (number 11 on the election list) for the Kyiv City Council of the party Voice in the 2020 Kyiv local election set for 25 October 2020. But the party only managed to win 9 seats.

Military career 
In 2022, he auctioned off both his NBA championship rings and memorabilia in order to raise money for the Ukrainian military. He and his wife both served in the military during Russian war against Ukraine.

References

External links
Player profile on NBA.com
Player profile on ESPN.com
Interview with Medvedenko
Slava's First American TV Interview
Player profile on basketball-reference.com

1979 births
Living people
Atlanta Hawks players
BC Budivelnyk players
Los Angeles Lakers players
National Basketball Association players from Ukraine
Power forwards (basketball)
Ukrainian expatriate basketball people in the United States
Ukrainian men's basketball players
Undrafted National Basketball Association players
Voice (Ukrainian political party) politicians
21st-century Ukrainian politicians